Anita Jane Bryant (born March 25, 1940) is an American singer and political activist, known for anti-gay activism. She scored three Top 20 hits in the United States in the early 1960s. She was the 1958 Miss Oklahoma beauty pageant winner, and a brand ambassador from 1969 to 1980 for the Florida Citrus Commission.

In the 1970s, Bryant became known as an outspoken opponent of gay rights in the U.S. In 1977, she ran the "Save Our Children" campaign to repeal a local ordinance in Miami-Dade County, Florida, that prohibited discrimination on the basis of sexual orientation. Her involvement with the campaign was condemned by gay rights activists. They were assisted by many other prominent figures in music, film, and television, and retaliated by boycotting the orange juice that she promoted. Though the campaign ended successfully with a 69% majority vote to repeal the ordinance on June 7, 1977 (Dade County restored the ordinance in 1998), it permanently damaged her public image, and her contract with the Florida Citrus Commission was terminated three years later. This, as well as her later divorce from Bob Green, damaged her financially. Bryant never regained her former prominence and filed for bankruptcy twice. She lives in her home state of Oklahoma and runs the Oklahoma City-based Anita Bryant Ministries International and she works with a host of charities and non-profits.

Early life and career
Bryant was born in Barnsdall, Oklahoma, the daughter of Lenora A. (Berry) and Warren Bryant. After her parents divorced, her father went into the U.S. Army and her mother went to work as a clerk for Tinker Air Force Base, taking her children to live with their grandparents temporarily. When Bryant was two years old, her grandfather taught her to sing "Jesus Loves Me". She was singing onstage at the age of six, at local fairgrounds in Oklahoma. She sang occasionally on radio and television, and was invited to audition when Arthur Godfrey's talent show came to town.

Bryant became Miss Oklahoma in 1958, and was second runner-up in the 1959 Miss America pageant (held September 6, 1958) at age 18, right after graduating from Tulsa's Will Rogers High School.

In 1960, Bryant married Bob Green (1931–2012), a Miami disc jockey, with whom she eventually raised four children: Robert Jr. (Bobby), Gloria, and twins Billy and Barbara. She divorced him in 1980, attracting allegations of hypocrisy from the Christian right, who cited the indissolubility of Christian marriage. She appeared early in her career on the NBC interview program Here's Hollywood and on the same network's The Ford Show, starring Tennessee Ernie Ford.

Between 1964 and 1969, Bryant performed at multiple White House functions, including both the Democratic Convention in Chicago and the Miami Republican Convention in 1968.

From 1961 until 1968, Bryant frequently joined Bob Hope on holiday tours for the United Service Organizations. She again traveled with Hope for televised shows during the Vietnam War. Bryant was given the Silver Medallion Award from the National Guard for "outstanding service by an entertainer", and the Veterans of Foreign Wars Leadership Gold Medallion.

Bryant had a moderate pop hit with the song "Till There Was You" (1959, US No. 30), from the Broadway production The Music Man. She also had three hits that reached the Top 20 in the U.S.: "Paper Roses" (1960, US No. 5, and covered by Marie Osmond 13 years later), "In My Little Corner of the World" (1960, US No. 10), and "Wonderland by Night" (1961, US No. 18), originally a hit for Bert Kaempfert. "Paper Roses", "In My Little Corner of the World", and "Till There Was You", each sold over one million copies, and were awarded a gold disc by the RIAA.

Bryant released several albums on the Carlton and Columbia labels. Her first album, eponymously titled and released in 1959, contained "Till There Was You" and other songs from other Broadway shows. Her second album, Hear Anita Bryant in Your Home Tonight (1961), contains "Paper Roses" and "Wonderland by Night", as well as several songs that first appeared in her singles. Her third album, In My Little Corner of the World, also in 1961, contains the title song and other songs that have to do with places around the world, including "Canadian Sunset" and "I Love Paris". Bryant's compilation album, Greatest Hits (1963), contains both her original Carlton hits (because Columbia purchased all the masters from Carlton) plus sides from her Columbia recordings, including "Paper Roses" and "Step by Step, Little by Little". In 1964, she released The World of Lonely People, containing, in addition to the title song, "Welcome, Welcome Home" and a new rendition of "Little Things Mean a Lot", arranged by Frank Hunter. Bryant also released several albums of religious music.

In 1969, Bryant became a spokeswoman for the Florida Citrus Commission, and nationally televised commercials featured her singing "Come to the Florida Sunshine Tree" and stating the commercials' tagline: "Breakfast without orange juice is like a day without sunshine." (Later, the slogan became, "It isn't just for breakfast anymore!") In addition during that time, she appeared in advertisements for Coca-Cola, Kraft Foods, Holiday Inn, and Tupperware. In the 1970s, Bryant was teamed up with the Disney Character "Orange Bird", with whom she appeared in several orange juice commercials. She also sang the Orange Bird Song and narrated the Orange Bird record album, with music written by the Sherman Brothers. She also published her cookbook, Bless This Food: The Anita Bryant Family Cookbook, described as "Much more than a cookbook, this is the story of a family devoted to Christ."

Bryant sang "The Battle Hymn of the Republic" during the half-time show of Super Bowl V in 1971, and at the graveside services for President of the United States Lyndon B. Johnson in 1973.

Bryant hosted a two-hour television special, The Anita Bryant Spectacular, in March 1980. She recounted her autobiography, appeared in medleys of prerecorded songs, and interviewed Pat Boone. The West Point Glee Club and General William Westmoreland participated.

Anti-gay rights activism
 
Bryant is known for her anti-gay rights activism.

On March 23, 1969, Bryant participated in a Rally for Decency at the Orange Bowl to protest an incident involving Jim Morrison and The Doors' performance in Miami, Florida in 1969.

In 1977, Dade County, Florida, passed an ordinance sponsored by Bryant's former friend Ruth Shack that prohibited discrimination on the basis of sexual orientation. Bryant led a highly publicized campaign to repeal the ordinance, as the leader of a coalition named Save Our Children. The campaign was based on conservative Christian beliefs regarding the sinfulness of homosexuality and the proposed threat of homosexual recruitment of children and child molestation. Bryant stated:

She also perpetuated the idea of the gay community 'recruiting' children through child abuse to become homosexual themselves. When Shack and other leaders refused to vote in opposition to the ordinance as per her request, she pleaded with families directly "The recruitment of our children is absolutely necessary for the survival and growth of homosexuality… for since homosexuals cannot reproduce, they must recruit, must freshen their ranks."

The campaign marked the beginning of an organized opposition to gay rights that spread across the nation. Jerry Falwell Sr. went to Miami to help Bryant. She made the following statements during the campaign: "As a mother, I know that homosexuals cannot biologically reproduce children; therefore, they must recruit our children" and "If gays are granted rights, next we'll have to give rights to prostitutes and to people who sleep with St. Bernards and to nail biters." She also said, "All America and all the world will hear what the people have said, and with God's continued help we will prevail in our fight to repeal similar laws throughout the nation."

The name of the campaign had to be changed to "Protect America's Children" because of legal action by the Save the Children foundation.

Victory and defeat

On June 7, 1977, Bryant's campaign led to a repeal of the anti-discrimination ordinance by a margin of 69 to 31 percent. However, the success of Bryant's campaign galvanized her opponents, and the gay community retaliated against her by forming the Coalition for Human Rights and the Miami Victory Campaign, who organized a boycott of orange juice. Gay bars all over North America stopped serving screwdrivers and replaced them with the "Anita Bryant Cocktail", which was made with vodka and apple juice. Also merchandise such as buttons, bumper stickers, and T-shirts with slogans such as "A day without human rights is like a day without sunshine" were sold to push the anti-discrimination movement further. Sales and proceeds went to gay rights activists to help fund their fight against Bryant and her campaign.

In 1977, Florida legislators approved a measure prohibiting gay adoption. The ban was overturned more than 30 years later when, on November 25, 2008, Miami-Dade Circuit Court Judge Cindy S. Lederman declared it unconstitutional.

Bryant became one of the first persons to be publicly assaulted by being "pied" as a political act. During a television appearance in Iowa on October 14, 1977, Bryant was assaulted by a pie thrown at her by Thom L. Higgins (1950–1994). Bryant quipped "At least it's a fruit pie," making a pun on the derogatory slur of "fruit" for a gay man. While covered in pie after the assault, she began to pray to God to forgive the activist "for his deviant lifestyle" before bursting into tears as the cameras continued rolling. Bryant's husband said that he would not retaliate, but followed the protesters outside and threw a pie at them. By this time, gay activists ensured that the boycott on Florida orange juice had become more prominent and it was supported by many celebrities, including Paul Williams, Vincent Price (he joked in a television interview that Oscar Wilde's A Woman of No Importance referred to her), and Jane Fonda.  Johnny Carson also made Bryant a regular target of ridicule in his nightly monologues. In 1978, Bryant and Bob Green told the story of their campaign in the book At Any Cost. The gay community continued to regard Bryant's name as synonymous with bigotry and homophobia. But at the same time, her name became a call to action for gay rights activists, and motivated many to picket her events, host anti-Bryant protests across the country, and increase attendance in and frequency of pride marches.

Bryant led several more campaigns around the country to repeal local anti-discrimination ordinances, including campaigns in St. Paul, Minnesota; Wichita, Kansas; and Eugene, Oregon. In 1978, her success led to the Briggs Initiative in California, which would have made pro-gay statements regarding homosexual people or homosexuality by any public school employee cause for dismissal. Grassroots liberal organizations, chiefly in Los Angeles and the San Francisco Bay Area, organized to defeat the initiative. Days before the election, the California Democratic Party opposed the proposed legislation. President Jimmy Carter, Governor Jerry Brown, former president Gerald Ford, and former governor Ronald Reagan—then planning a run for the presidency—all voiced opposition to the initiative, and it ultimately suffered a massive defeat at the polls.

In 1998, the Miami-Dade County Commission narrowly reinstated the ordinance protecting individuals from discrimination on the basis of sexual orientation, by a narrow 7-6 vote. In 2002, a ballot initiative to repeal the 1998 law, called Amendment 14, was voted down by 56 percent of the voters. The Florida statute forbidding gay adoption was upheld in 2004 by a federal appellate court against a constitutional challenge but was overturned by a Miami-Dade circuit court in November 2008.

In 2021, Bryant's granddaughter, Sarah Green, came out publicly on an episode of Slate’s One Year podcast series by announcing her pending marriage to a woman, although she was having difficulty deciding whether she should invite her grandmother to the ceremony.

Career decline and bankruptcies
The fallout from Bryant's political activism hurt her business and entertainment career. In February 1977, the Singer Corporation rescinded an offer to sponsor an upcoming weekly variety show because of the "extensive national publicity arising from [Bryant's] controversial political activities."

Bryant's marriage to Bob Green also failed at that time, and in 1980 she divorced him, citing emotional abuse and latent suicidal thoughts. Green refused to accept this, saying that his fundamentalist religious beliefs did not recognize civil divorce and that she was still his wife "in God's eyes". In 2007, Green stated: "Blame gay people? I do. Their stated goal was to put her out of business and destroy her career. And that's what they did. It's unfair."

Some Christian fundamentalist audiences and venues shunned Bryant after her divorce. Because she was no longer invited to appear at their events, she lost a major source of income. The Florida Citrus Commission also allowed her contract to lapse after the divorce, stating that Bryant had "worn out" as a spokesperson.

Bryant rapidly became an object of ridicule, as her image shifted from being a model Christian spokeswoman to that of a self-righteous bigot. The decline of her reputation was aided by Tonight Show host Johnny Carson, and other talk-show hosts and comedians, as they mocked her and her actions to the greater public. This led to many of her endorsements being cancelled and sponsors to drop her from their labels as she seemed to be a liability to them.

With three of her four children, she moved from Miami to Selma, Alabama, and later to Atlanta, Georgia. In a 1980 Ladies' Home Journal article she said, "The church needs to wake up and find some way to cope with divorce and women's problems." She also expressed some sympathy for feminist aspirations, given her own experiences of emotional abuse within her previous marriage. Bryant also commented on her anti-gay views and said, "I'm more inclined to say live and let live, just don't flaunt it or try to legalize it." In a 2012 interview, her son Robert Green, Jr. said "she would be putting a lot more energy into fighting gay rights if she still felt as strongly."

Bryant appeared in Michael Moore's 1989 documentary film Roger & Me, in which she is interviewed and travels to Flint, Michigan, as part of the effort to revitalize its devastated local economy.

Bryant married her second husband, Charlie Hobson Dry, in 1990. The couple tried to reestablish her music career in a series of small venues, including Branson, Missouri, and Pigeon Forge, Tennessee, where they opened Anita Bryant's Music Mansion. The establishment combined Bryant's performances of her successful songs from early in her career with a "lengthy segment in which she preached her Christian beliefs". The venture was not successful and the Music Mansion, which had missed meeting payrolls at times, filed for bankruptcy in 2001 with Bryant and Dry leaving behind a series of unpaid employees and creditors.

Bryant also spent part of the 1990s in Branson, Missouri, where the state and federal governments both filed liens claiming more than $116,000 in unpaid taxes.

In 1996, Bryant said she was happy to be out of show business.

Other activities
In 2005, Bryant returned to Barnsdall, Oklahoma, to attend the town's 100th anniversary celebration and to have a street renamed in her honor. She returned to her high school in Tulsa on April 21, 2007, to perform in the school's annual musical revue. , she was living in Edmond, Oklahoma, and said she was doing charity work for various youth organizations while heading Anita Bryant Ministries International.

Writing
Mark D. Jordan has written: "Many of her public statements, including her books, were ghostwritten by others, and there is internal reason to conclude that the most political books were pasted together by several hands from various sources."

Mine Eyes Have Seen the Glory (Old Tappan, NJ: Fleming H. Revell, 1970)
Amazing Grace (Old Tappan, NJ: Fleming H. Revell, 1971)
Bless This House (Old Tappan, NJ: Fleming H. Revell, 1972)
Bless This Food: The Anita Bryant Family Cookbook (NY: Doubleday, 1975)
The Anita Bryant Story: The Survival of Our Nation's Families and the Threat of Militant Homosexuality (Old Tappan, NJ: Fleming H. Revell, 1977)

With Bob Green

Fishers of Men (Old Tappan, NJ: Fleming H. Revell, 1973)
Light My Candle (Old Tappan, NJ: Fleming H. Revell, 1974)
Running the Good Race (Old Tappan, NJ: Fleming H. Revell, 1976), fitness guidance
Raising God's Children (Old Tappan, NJ: Fleming H. Revell, 1977)

Discography

Albums
{| class="wikitable" style=text-align:center;
|-
!Year
!Album
! Billboard 200
! Record Label
|-
|| 1959
|align=left| Anita Bryant
| -
|rowspan="3"| Carlton Records
|-
|| 1960
|align=left| Hear Anita Bryant in Your Home Tonight!
| -
|-
|rowspan="2"| 1961
|align=left| In My Little Corner of the World
| 99
|-
|align=left| Kisses Sweeter Than Wine
| -
|rowspan="11"| Columbia Records
|-
|rowspan="3"| 1962
|align=left| Abiding Love
| -
|-
|align=left| In a Velvet Mood
| 145
|-
|align=left| The ABC Stories of Jesus
| -
|-
|rowspan="2"| 1963
|align=left| The Country's Best
| -
|-
|align=left| Anita Bryant's Greatest Hits
| -
|-
|rowspan="2"| 1964
|align=left| The World of Lonely People
| -
|-
|align=left| The Best of Johnny Desmond & Anita Bryant at Jubilee 1964
| -
|-
|| 1965
|align=left| I Believe
| -
|-
|| 1966
|align=left| Mine Eyes Have Seen the Glory
| 146
|-
|| 1967
|align=left| Do You Hear What I Hear?: Christmas with Anita Bryant
| 25
|-
|rowspan="3"| 1968
|align=left| Anita Bryant
| -
|| Harmony Records
|-
|align=left| How Great Thou Art
| -
|rowspan="2"| Columbia Records
|-
|align=left| In Remembrance of You
| -
|-
|| 1969
|align=left| Little Things Mean a Lot
| -
|rowspan="2"| Harmony Records
|-
|rowspan="2"| 1970
|align=left| World Without Love
| -
|-
|align=left| Abide with Me
| -
|| Word Records
|-
|rowspan="2"| 1972
|align=left| Naturally
| -
|| Myrrh Records
|-
|align=left| The Miracle of Christmas
| -
|| Word Records
|-
|rowspan="2"| 1973
|align=left| Sweet Hour of Prayer
| -
|| Harmony Records
|-
|align=left| Battle Hymn of the Republic
| -
|rowspan="3"| Word Records
|- .
|rowspan="2"| 1975
|align=left| Old Fashioned Prayin'''
| -
|-
|align=left| Anita Bryant's All-Time Favorite Hymns| -
|-
|| 1985
|align=left| Anita with Love| -
|| BL Records
|}

Singles

In popular culture
Bryant's name has frequently been invoked as a prototypical example of opposition to LGBT rights. When Elton John was criticized for touring Russia in 1979, he responded: "I wouldn't say I won't tour in America because I can't stand Anita Bryant". In his song "Mañana", Jimmy Buffett sings "I hope Anita Bryant never ever does one of my songs". In 1978, David Allan Coe recorded the song "Fuck Aneta Briant"  on his album Nothing Sacred. California punk rock band Dead Kennedys referenced Bryant in their song "Moral Majority" from their 1981 EP In God We Trust, Inc. 

In 1977, the Dutch levenslied singer Zangeres Zonder Naam wrote the protest song "Luister Anita" ("Listen Up, Anita") on the occasion of the protest night "Miami Nightmare", organized in the Amsterdam Concertgebouw. The nightly concert was intended to raise funds for an advertisement in Time, in which the Dutch nation was to call on the American people to protect the rights of minorities. In the song, Zangeres Zonder Naam compared Anita Bryant to Hitler and called on homosexuals to fight for their rights. The song became an integral part of her repertoire and cemented her status as a cult figure among Dutch homosexuals.

Steve Gerber, in his Howard the Duck for Marvel Comics, made an organization called the Sinister S.O.O.F.I. (Save Our Offspring from Indecency) who were led by Anita Bryant.  Although it was not explicitly stated, even The New York Times called the implication "transparent".

Bryant was regularly lampooned on Saturday Night Live, sometimes with her politics as the target, sometimes her reputation as a popular, traditional entertainer known for her commercials as the target, and sometimes targeting a combination of the two. Her name was also a frequent punchline on The Gong Show, such as the time host/producer Chuck Barris joked that Bryant was releasing a new Christmas album called Gay Tidings. Some references were less overtly political, but equally critical. In the film Airplane!, Leslie Nielsen's character, upon seeing a large number of passengers become violently ill, vomit, and have uncontrollable flatulence, remarked: "I haven't seen anything like this since the Anita Bryant concert."Airplane! (film), 1980, Paramount Pictures. Other television shows that targeted her were Soap, Designing Women, and The Golden Girls. She was also the target of mockery in the RiffTrax short Drugs Are Like That.

Armistead Maupin, in his 1980 novel More Tales of the City, used Anita Bryant's "Save Our Children" campaign to prompt a principal character to come out of the closet.

In the cold open of a 2005 episode of Will and Grace, 'Dance Cards and Greeting Cards', Karen Walker refers to Bryant as her former arch nemesis and references Bryant's former position as the spokesman for the Florida Citrus Commission: "Well, I said the same thing to him I said to Anita: "Squeeze your own oranges!"".

Bryant appears in archive footage as a principal antagonist in the 2008 American biographical film Milk, about the life of gay rights activist and politician Harvey Milk. She was also portrayed as the principal antagonist in the 2011 play, Anita Bryant Died For Your Sins.In May 2013, producers announced plans for a biographical HBO film based on Bryant's life to star Uma Thurman, with a script from gay screenwriter Chad Hodge. Long languishing in development, as of 2019, Ashley Judd and Neil Patrick Harris have been attached to the project.

Bryant's likeness is portrayed by a drag performer in the comedic play, Anita Bryant's Playboy Interview, which premiered in 2016 in Silver Lake, Los Angeles and is based on her 1978 Playboy interview with Ken Kelley. Bryant is a frequently portrayed character at drag shows across the United States.

Bryant is the subject of the musical The Loneliest Girl in the World, which had its world premiere run at Diversionary Theatre in San Diego during mid-2018.

Archive footage of her was used in The Gospel of Eureka, a 2018 documentary by Michael Palmieri and Donal Mosher about the lives of LGBT individuals and evangelical Christians in Eureka Springs, Arkansas.

See also

 Anti-LGBT slogans
 Homophobic propaganda

References

External links

Anita Bryant Ministries International

Image of Anita Bryant in the 1970s (Available for public use from the State Archives of Florida)
Belated curtain call, Tulsa World, April 19, 2007
Readers Forum: Anita Bryant to star in Round-Up 2007, Tulsa World, April 18, 2007
Celebration draws Anita Bryant back to Barnsdall, Tulsa World, May 28, 2005
 Bryant, Anita, Encyclopedia of Oklahoma History and Culture''

 
1940 births
Living people
20th-century American singers
20th-century American women singers
21st-century American women
Activists from Florida
Activists from Oklahoma
American gospel singers
American political activists
American women pop singers
Baptists from Oklahoma
Carlton Records artists
Columbia Records artists
Conservatism in the United States
Discrimination against LGBT people in the United States
LGBT history in Florida
Miss America 1950s delegates
Musicians from Tulsa, Oklahoma
People from Osage County, Oklahoma
Singers from Oklahoma
Southern Baptists
Traditional pop music singers
Women in Florida politics
Word Records artists
Anti-LGBT sentiment
United Service Organizations entertainers